America: The Story of Us (also internationally known as America: The Story of the U.S.) is a 12-part, 9-hour documentary-drama television miniseries that premiered on April 25, 2010, on History. Produced by Nutopia, the program portrays more than 400 years of American history (with emphasis on how American creation of new technologies has had effects on the nation's history and, by implication, the world). It spans time from the successful English settlement of Jamestown beginning in 1607, through to the present day. Narrated by Liev Schreiber (Danny Webb for the international version), the series recreates many historical events by using actors dressed in the style of the period and computer-generated special effects. The miniseries received mixed reviews by critics; but it attracted the largest audiences of any special aired by the channel to date.

Episodes

Commentators
The following are commentators who appear on the miniseries (listed in alphabetical order):
 Buzz Aldrin – Former astronaut and second person to set foot on the Moon.
 David Baldacci – Bestselling American novelist.
 Tony Bennett – Singer.
 Michael Bloomberg – Former Mayor of New York City.
 William Bodette – Marine first sergeant.
 Anthony Bourdain – American chef and writer.
 Henry W. Brands – Historian and Professor of History at University of Texas at Austin.
 Tom Brokaw – Journalist and former anchor of NBC Nightly News.
 Albert Camarillo – History professor at Stanford University.
 Margaret Cho – Comedian, actress, and activist.
 Sean "Diddy" Combs – Record producer, rapper, actor, and men's fashion designer.
 Sheryl Crow – Singer-songwriter, musician, and actress.
 Michael Douglas – Actor and producer.
 Melissa Etheridge – Singer-songwriter.
 Henry Louis Gates Jr. – Harvard University professor.
 Newt Gingrich – Former Speaker of the United States House of Representatives.
 Rudy Giuliani – Former Mayor of New York City.
 Annette Gordon-Reed – Pulitzer Prize-winning American historian and law professor.
 Tim Gunn – Creative director of Liz Claiborne and former mentor on Project Runway.
 Sean Hannity – American radio/television host and political commentator.
 Rick Harrison – Co-owner of the Gold & Silver Pawn Shop.
 Bruce Jenner – American Olympic Gold Medalist and reality TV figure.
 Steven Berlin Johnson – American popular science author.
 David Kennedy – American historian.
 John Lasseter – American animator, former chief creative officer of Pixar and Walt Disney Animation Studios.
 John Legend – Recording artist, musician, and actor.
 Richard Machowicz – Former Navy SEAL, weapons expert, and host of Future Weapons.
 Bill Maher – Political commentator and comedian, and the host of Real Time.
 Joseph Marinaccio – American business magnate, founder and CEO of Slam Content.
 Barack Obama –  The then-President of the United States of America (introduces the series).
 Soledad O'Brien – American journalist and CNN figure.
 I. M. Pei – Chinese-born American architect.
 David Petraeus – United States Army general and Former Director of the Central Intelligence Agency.
 Colin Powell – former Secretary of State and Chairman of the Joint Chiefs of Staff.
 Al Sharpton – Baptist minister and civil rights activist.
 Richard Slotkin – Olin Professor of English and American studies at Wesleyan University.
 Richard Norton Smith – American historian and author specializing in US presidents.
 Martha Stewart – Business magnate, media figure, author, and magazine publisher.
 Michael Strahan – Former NFL football player and later media personality.
 Meryl Streep – Academy Award-winning actress.
Donald Trump – Real estate tycoon, media figure, and later President of the United States. 
 Jimmy Wales – Co-founder of Wikipedia.
 Vera Wang – American fashion designer.
 Brian Williams – Former anchor and managing editor of NBC Nightly News.

Reception
The documentary received a 60% approval rating from Metacritic.com. Many criticized the series for having too many "celebrities" express their opinions about the United States, rather than having historians provide more insight and data about particular periods and events.

Critics praised the series' willingness to grapple with some of the difficult issues in US history, including African slavery, racial segregation and the genocide of the Native Americans. Mary McNamara, of the Los Angeles Times, wrote that "'America: The Story of Us' seems to draw its inspiration from Fox's '24' and the E! Channel." She continues, "[I]n the first hour, producer Jane Root seems more enamored of her ability to conjure, in glorious CG, the lifecycle of a tobacco plant or the brick-by-brick construction of New Amsterdam than anything so dull as explaining the complexities of actual history."

Critics generally commented that CGI effects were overused, as were clichéd soundbites and hyperbole that seemed intended to move the narrative along. Tom Shales of The Washington Post found seven repetitions of the notion that "What happened next would change the course of US history forever" within the first episode, and remarked: "Maybe everything that happens changes the course of something. Or maybe nothing that happens changes the course of anything. Simply saying 'everything changed forever' is really a substitute for thinking, not an example of it, but then 'America: The Story of Us' is basically a poor excuse for a documentary—even if it succeeds on the superficial level of, say, a lava lamp."

Surpassed by the series The Bible, which garnered over 13 million viewers of its first episode, America: The Story of US was watched by 5.7 million total viewers for its first episode and drew a 4.0 household rating. In conjunction with the broadcast, the History channel launched its largest educational outreach initiative, offering a series DVD to every school and accredited college in the United States.

America: The Story of Us has been nominated for four Emmy Awards for the episode "Division", which traced the growing tensions between the North and South, as well as contrasts between plantation and urban economies. The nominations were in the categories for non-fiction programming of "Outstanding Cinematography", "Outstanding Picture Editing ", "Outstanding Sound Editing" and "Outstanding Writing".

International edition
An Australian series based on the American series, titled Australia: The Story of Us, aired from February 25, 2015 on the Seven Network.

A 10-episode Canadian series entitled Canada: The Story of Us, aired from March–May 2017 on the CBC.

References

External links
 
 "Obama Introduces 'America The Story Of Us'"
 "'America: The Story of Us' breaks ratings records", Cinema Blend
 Emmy Nominations

History (American TV channel) original programming
2010s American documentary television series
2010 American television series debuts
2010 American television series endings
Television series about the history of the United States